The 2022–23 Southern Counties East Football League season will be the 57th in the history of the Southern Counties East Football League, and the seventh year the competition will have two divisions, the Premier Division and Division One, at levels 9 and 10 of the English football league system.

The provisional club allocations for steps 5 and 6 were announced by The Football Association on 12 May.

Premier Division

The Premier Division comprised 16 clubs from the previous season, along with four new clubs after Sheppey United and Chatham Town were promoted to Isthmian League South East Division, Crowborough Athletic's transfer to Southern Combination Football League and Tower Hamlets' relegation to Eastern Counties League Division One South

The four clubs that joined the division were:
Phoenix Sports - Relegated from Isthmian League South East Division
Stansfeld - Promoted from Division One
Sutton Athletic - Promoted from Division One
Whitstable Town - Relegated from Isthmian League South East Division

Premier Division table

Results table

Division One
Division One consisted of eighteen teams, down from twenty teams in the previous season. Teams that left Division One from the previous season were Stansfeld and Sutton Athletic who had been promoted to the Premier Division, Chessington & Hook United's relegation was reprieved and transferred to the Southern Combination Football League Division One and Westside who were relocated to the Combined Counties Football League.

The two new teams that joined the division were:
AFC Whyteleafe - Applied from Surrey South Eastern Combination Intermediate Division One
Bermondsey Town - Applied from Bromley & South London Football League

Division One table

References

2022-23
9